The Massachusetts State Amateur Championship or Massachusetts Amateur is a golf championship held in Massachusetts for the state's top amateur golfers. The tournament is run by the Massachusetts Golf Association (MGA) in mid-July each year. The amateur championship is the biggest and most subscribed event on the MGA calendar. Tournament entries are open to any amateur golfer who holds membership in an MGA member club and has an up-to-date MGA/USGA GHIN Handicap Index not exceeding 4.4.

History
The first event was held in 1903 at the Myopia Hunt Club and won by Arther Lockwood. Thirty eight contestants entered from the 42 MGA member clubs. Today the tournament holds a field of 144 players from 400 golf facilities across the state. The Championship starts with two days of stroke play. The low 32 scores continue on to match play competition. Since 1992, five Massachusetts Amateur Champions have turned professional: Trevor Gliwski, Flynt Lincoln, James Driscoll, Jim Salinetti and Rob Oppenheim. The most famous winner of the championship was six-time champion Francis Ouimet, the most successful golfer ever from the Commonwealth of Massachusetts. Other notable winners include Jesse Guilford, Dick Chapman and Eddie Lowery. Fred Wright holds the record with seven titles (1920, 1926, 1927, 1928, 1929, 1931, and 1938). 2008 marked the 100th playing of the Massachusetts Amateur.

References

External links
Massachusetts Golf Association
List of winners

1903 establishments in Massachusetts
Amateur golf tournaments in the United States
Golf in Massachusetts
Recurring sporting events established in 1903
Sports competitions in Massachusetts